DaMarques Johnson (born June 28, 1982) is a retired American mixed martial artist. He competed for the UFC and King of the Cage and was the Welterweight runner-up on The Ultimate Fighter: United States vs. United Kingdom.

Background
Johnson was born and raised in West Jordan, Utah, he and his family were poor and lived in a rough part of the town. Johnson was primarily raised by his Mormon  mother, as his father died when he was nine years old. Johnson attended and graduated from Kearns High School, where he competed in wrestling and basketball and would often get into fights. In 2000, Johnson joined the United States Army and National Guard, an option given to him as a kid to get out of some trouble. Johnson, who was a standout in hand to hand combat, worked in the S-1 and did paperwork for other soldiers while assigned to a Special Forces group. It was in 2001, while still enlisted, when a fellow soldier in his platoon introduced to Johnson to Brazilian jiu-jitsu. He trained at Close Combat Institute (CCI) After returning to civilian life following his eight years of active duty, he met Jeremy Horn and began training in mixed martial arts at his gym. Before taping for the Ultimate Fighter, DaMarques taught children's Brazilian jiu-jitsu classes at Sandy's Elite Performance gym.

Mixed martial arts career

Early career
Johnson, who in the earlier portions of his career fought as high in the weight classes as Heavyweight had his first fight in 2005, losing by technical knockout. He was submitted by the highly regarded Brock Larson in his second fight. In his third professional fight, Johnson had his first win at a King of the Cage event, winning the fight by submission due to punches.

The Ultimate Fighter
Johnson appeared on The Ultimate Fighter: United States vs. United Kingdom. He defeated Ray Elbe by technical knockout in an elimination match earning him a spot on the United States team. Johnson won his second fight against Dean Amasinger by submission using a triangle choke, which is noted by his coaches and teammates to be his signature submission move. Johnson won his semi-final match up against Nick Osipczak by unanimous decision. This win earned him the first spot in the Welterweight Finals.

Johnson also gained notoriety throughout the series due to his ongoing feud with Team UK coach Michael Bisping. Tensions reached an all-time high after Bisping squirted water into Johnson's face citing that Johnson had made a racist comment toward him earlier in the week. However, the comment was made by fellow USA teammate Cameron Dollar, causing Bisping to apologize to Johnson for his behavior.

Ultimate Fighting Championship
Johnson lost his UFC debut when he fought James Wilks on June 20, 2009 in Las Vegas to crown the TUF 9 welterweight winner. Johnson tapped out to a rear-naked choke with six seconds left in round one. After the finale, Johnson was offered a multi-fight contract with the UFC.

Johnson was scheduled to face off against Peter Sobotta on November 14, 2009 at UFC 105, but the bout was cancelled due to a military commitment for Sobotta. Johnson instead fought and defeated Edgar García via submission (triangle choke) in the first round at UFC 107, earning him a Submission of the Night bonus. UFC.com ranked the submission fourth in the UFC's 2009 Submission of Year and had honorable mention for UFC's 2009 Fight of the Year.

At UFC 112, Johnson fought seasoned veteran Brad Blackburn, defeating him via third-round TKO with a kick to the body and follow up punches. Johnson received his second UFC bonus, winning Knockout of the Night honors.

Johnson then faced Matthew Riddle on August 1, 2010, at UFC on Versus 2. However, Johnson weighed in at 172.5 lb (and only lost half a pound after the weigh-in). Johnson had to give up 20% of his purse to Riddle. Riddle defeated Johnson via TKO in the second round.

Johnson next faced Mike Guymon on January 22, 2011 at UFC Fight Night 23. He won the fight via verbal submission in the first round after applying a body triangle.

Johnson faced Amir Sadollah on March 26, 2011 at UFC Fight Night 24, replacing an injured James Wilks on just two weeks notice. Johnson lost the bout in the second round after tapping out to elbows while he was trapped in the 'gift wrap' control.

Johnson was expected to face Clay Harvison on September 17, 2011 at UFC Fight Night 25 However, Johnson was forced from the bout with an injury and replaced by Seth Baczynski.

Johnson/Harvison took place on November 12, 2011 at UFC on Fox 1. Johnson won the fight via first-round KO after hitting Harvison with an uppercut that knocked him down and seemingly unconscious.

Johnson fought British fighter John Maguire on April 14, 2012 at UFC on Fuel TV: Gustafsson vs. Silva. He lost the fight via submission in the second round.

Johnson faced Mike Swick on August 4, 2012 at UFC on FOX 4. Swick rocked Johnson early in the first round but Johnson weathered the storm and seemed to have the advantage at the end of the round with his grappling. Early in the second round Swick leg swept Johnson to the ground and finished him off with a punch; followed by two more strikes to an already unconscious Johnson.

Johnson was tabbed as a short notice replacement and faced promotional newcomer Gunnar Nelson at a catchweight of 175 lbs. on September 29, 2012 at UFC on Fuel TV 5, replacing an injured Pascal Krauss. Johnson did not make weight, coming in at 183 lbs. and lost the fight via first round submission due to a rear naked choke. After his loss to Nelson and missing weight by 8 lbs., Johnson was released from the UFC.

Post-UFC career
Johnson was expected to face Jason South at Showdown Fights 10 on February 8, 2013, however the bout was cancelled prior to the event.

Finally, over a year after his UFC release, Johnson faced Ian Williams at Cage Warrior Combat 9 on November 2, 2013. He lost the fight via split decision. He was then expected to face Indalecio Tat Romero at Dakota FC: Winter Brawl on January 11, 2014. However, Johnson was forced out of the bout due to injury.

He was expected to face Dan Stittgen in the main event of APFC 16 on April 5, 2014, however Johnson was removed from the bout and the fight was cancelled.

Johnson fought Matt Dwyer at Battlefield Fight League 30 on May 23, 2014. He lost via second-round TKO, bringing his losing streak to five in a row.

Personal life
Johnson has a son.

Championships and accomplishments
Throwdown Showdown
TS Welterweight Championship (One time)
Ultimate Fighting Championship
Submission of the Night (One time) vs. Edgar García 
Knockout of the Night (One time) vs. Brad Blackburn

Mixed martial arts record

|-
|Loss
|align=center| 16–15
| Joe Rodriguez
| Submission (Von Flue choke)
| SteelFist Fight Night 36: Conflict
|
|align=center| 2
|align=center| 3:52
|Salt Lake City, Utah, United States
|
|-
|Loss
|align=center| 16–14
| Matt Dwyer
| TKO (punches)
| BFL 30: Battlefield Fight League
|
|align=center| 2
|align=center| 3:39
|Richmond, British Columbia, Canada
|
|-
|Loss
|align=center| 16–13
| Ian Williams
| Decision (split)
| Cage Warrior Combat 9
|
|align=center| 3
|align=center| 5:00
|Kent, Washington, United States
|
|-
|Loss
|align=center| 16–12
| Gunnar Nelson
| Submission (rear-naked choke)
| UFC on Fuel TV: Struve vs. Miocic
| 
|align=center| 1
|align=center| 3:34
|Nottingham, England
| 
|-
| Loss
|align=center| 16–11
| Mike Swick
| KO (punches)
| UFC on Fox: Shogun vs. Vera
| 
|align=center| 2
|align=center| 1:20
|Los Angeles, California, United States
| 
|-
| Loss
|align=center| 16–10
| John Maguire
| Submission (armbar)
| UFC on Fuel TV: Gustafsson vs. Silva
| 
|align=center| 2
|align=center| 4:40
|Stockholm, Sweden
| 
|-
| Win
|align=center| 16–9
| Clay Harvison
| KO (punches)
| UFC on Fox: Velasquez vs. Dos Santos
| 
|align=center| 1
|align=center| 1:34
|Anaheim, California, United States
| 
|-
| Loss
|align=center| 15–9
| Amir Sadollah
| Submission (elbows)
| UFC Fight Night: Nogueira vs. Davis
| 
|align=center| 2
|align=center| 3:27
|Seattle, Washington, United States
| 
|-
| Win
|align=center| 15–8
| Mike Guymon
| Submission (body triangle)
| UFC: Fight for the Troops 2
| 
|align=center| 1
|align=center| 3:22
|Killeen, Texas, United States
| 
|-
| Loss
|align=center| 14–8
| Matthew Riddle
| TKO (punches)
| UFC Live: Jones vs. Matyushenko
| 
|align=center| 2
|align=center| 4:29
|San Diego, California, United States
| 
|-
| Win
|align=center| 14–7
| Brad Blackburn
| TKO (body kick and punches)
| UFC 112
| 
|align=center| 3
|align=center| 2:08
|Abu Dhabi, United Arab Emirates
| 
|-
| Win
|align=center| 13–7
| Edgar García
| Submission (triangle choke)
| UFC 107
| 
|align=center| 1
|align=center| 4:03
|Memphis, Tennessee, United States
| 
|-
| Loss
|align=center| 12–7
| James Wilks
| Submission (rear-naked choke)
| The Ultimate Fighter 9 Finale
| 
|align=center| 1
|align=center| 4:54
|Las Vegas, Nevada, United States
| 
|-
| Loss
|align=center| 12–6
| Ryan Williams
| Decision (unanimous)
| Extreme Challenge 109
| 
|align=center| 3
|align=center| 5:00
|Moline, Illinois, United States
| 
|-
| Win
|align=center| 12–5
| Brandon Olsen
| Submission (triangle choke)
| Throwdown Showdown 2
| 
|align=center| 2
|align=center| 1:31
|Orem, Utah, United States
|
|-
| Win
|align=center| 11–5
| Ron Vincent
| TKO (punches)
| Jeremy Horn's Elite Fight Night 3
| 
|align=center| 1
|align=center| 2:36
|Salt Lake City, Utah, United States
| 
|-
| Win
|align=center| 10–5
| Samuel Rauch
| Submission (triangle choke)
| Total Mayhem 1
| 
|align=center| 2
|align=center| 2:50
|Ogden, Utah, United States
| 
|-
| Win
|align=center| 9–5
| Harold Lucambio
| Submission (triangle choke)
| Throwdown Showdown 1
| 
|align=center| 1
|align=center| 1:53
|Orem, Utah, United States
| 
|-
| Win
|align=center| 8–5
| Sterling Nitsuma
| KO (knee)
| Jeremy Horn's Elite Fight Night 1
| 
|align=center| 1
|align=center| 2:05
|Salt Lake City, Utah, United States
| 
|-
| Win
|align=center| 7–5
| William Layton
| TKO (punches)
| UCE Round 28: Episode 2
| 
|align=center| 1
|align=center| 0:55
|Salt Lake City, Utah, United States
| 
|-
| Loss
|align=center| 6–5
| Court McGee
| Submission (guillotine choke)
| UCE Round 26: Finals
| 
|align=center| 3
|align=center| 1:50
|St. George, Utah, United States
| 
|-
| Win
|align=center| 6–4
| Hank Weiss
| Submission (punches)
| UCE Round 26: Episode 9
| 
|align=center| 2
|align=center| 1:15
|Sandy, Utah, United States
| 
|-
| Win
|align=center| 5–4
| Harold Lucambio
| Decision (unanimous)
| UCE Round 25: Finals
| 
|align=center| 3
|align=center| 3:00
|West Valley City, Utah, United States
| 
|-
| Loss
|align=center| 4–4
| Justin Wright
| TKO (punches)
| UCE Round 23: Episode 7
| 
|align=center| 1
|align=center| 4:27
|Sandy, Utah, United States
| 
|-
| Win
|align=center| 4–3
| Tim Panter
| TKO (punches)
| UCE Round 23: Episode 3
| 
|align=center| 2
|align=center| 5:00
| Sandy, Utah, United States
|
|- 
| Win
|align=center| 3–3
| Jake Paul
| Submission (kimura)
| Utah Fight Night 1
| 
|align=center| 1
|align=center| 4:16
|Salt Lake City, Utah, United States
| 
|-
|-
|Win 
|align=center| 2–3
| Harold Lucambio
| Decision (split)
| UCE: Round 19: Episode 2
| 
|align=center| 5
|align=center| 3:00
|Sandy, Utah, United States
|
|-
|Loss
|align=center| 1–3
| Justin Wright
| Submission (triangle choke)
| UCE Round 18: Episode 6
| 
|align=center| 2
|align=center| 1:48
|Salt Lake City, Utah, United States
| 
|-
| Win
|align=center| 1–2
| David Rodrique
| Submission (punches)
| KOTC: Shock and Awe
| 
|align=center| 1
|align=center| 1:51
|Edmonton, Alberta, Canada
| 
|-
| Loss
|align=center| 0–2
| Brock Larson
| Submission (keylock)
| Extreme Challenge 63
| 
|align=center| 3
|align=center| 1:02
|Hayward, Wisconsin, United States
| 
|-
| Loss
|align=center| 0–1
| Paul Purcell
| TKO (punches)
| XFC: Dome Of Destruction 1
| 
|align=center| 1
|align=center| 0:17
|Tacoma, Washington, United States
|

References

External links

UFC Profile
Sponsorship and Clothing Line

Living people
American practitioners of Brazilian jiu-jitsu
American male mixed martial artists
Mixed martial artists from Utah
Welterweight mixed martial artists
Mixed martial artists utilizing wrestling
Mixed martial artists utilizing Brazilian jiu-jitsu
Sportspeople from Salt Lake City
1982 births
Ultimate Fighting Championship male fighters